Mike Smiddy was the Illinois state representative for the 71st district. The 71st district includes all or parts of Savanna, Morrison, Sterling, Rock Falls, Port Byron, Hillsdale, Silvis, East Moline, Moline and Coal Valley.

References

External links
 Representative Mike Smiddy (D) 71st District at the Illinois General Assembly
 
 Rep. Mike Smiddy at Illinois House Democrats

Living people
Members of the Illinois House of Representatives
Year of birth missing (living people)
21st-century American politicians
People from Rock Island County, Illinois